Javiera Grez Valenzuela (born 11 July 2000) is a Chilean footballer who plays as a forward for Colo-Colo and the Chile women's national team.

International career
Grez represented Chile at the 2018 South American U-20 Women's Championship. She made her senior debut on 26 November 2017 in a 0–4 friendly loss against Brazil.

References 

2000 births
Living people
Chilean women's footballers
Women's association football forwards
Curicó Unido footballers
Chile women's international footballers
2019 FIFA Women's World Cup players
Grez family
Footballers at the 2020 Summer Olympics
Olympic footballers of Chile